Chris Camillo is an American author, investor and entrepreneur. He is the founder and CEO of TickerTags, a social data intelligence company, known for predicting the Brexit result in 2016. In 2020, he was featured in Jack Schwager's book Unknown Market Wizards: The best traders you've never heard of.

Career 
Chris Camillo started his investing career in 2007, when he invested 20,000 USD in the stock market, and produced more than $2 million in investment returns during the following three-year period. In 2014, an independent accountant's report of his personal investment returns for the period of December 1, 2006 through November 30 2013 was publicly published documenting seven years of 84% averaging portfolio returns.

In 2011, he wrote the book Laughing at Wall Street: How I beat the Pros at investing, published by St. Martin Press, in which he revealed some of his strategies and insights.

In 2015, and after two years of development, Chris launched his social data tool TickerTags, and a company with the same name. TickerTags is a social listening platform that gives investors the ability to monitor the conversation around keywords pertinent to publicly traded securities and other investable assets on platforms like Twitter.

References

Living people
American businesspeople
American writers
Year of birth missing (living people)
American investors
21st-century American writers